This is a list of noted directors of pornographic films.

A
Buck Adams
J. C. Adams
Asa Akira
Alexis Amore
Joanna Angel
Brad Armstrong

B

Jennifer Lyon Bell
Belladonna
Noel C. Bloom
Mick Blue
Vanessa Blue
John T. Bone
Lizzy Borden
Michael Brandon
Axel Braun
Seymore Butts
Tom Byron

C

Casey Calvert
Kim Chambers
Bob Chinn
David Aaron Clark
Tiffany Clark
Patrick Collins
Zebedy Colt
Eli Cross
Christopher Cumingham
Stoney Curtis

D

Gerard Damiano
Stormy Daniels
Gregory Dark
Gia Darling
Dillon Day
Jewel De'Nyle
Tom DeSimone
Devon
Dustin Diamond
Skin Diamond
Karen Dior
Jerry Douglas
Jessica Drake
Steve Drake

E

Jim Enright
Erik Everhard

F

Don Fernando
Abel Ferrara
Rod Fontana
Scotty Fox

G

Jamie Gillis
Gary Graver
Jay Grdina
Greg Lansky

H

Fred Halsted
Max Hardcore
Veronica Hart
Jenna Haze
William Higgins
Melissa Hill
Bobby Hollander
Jim Holliday
R. C. Hörsch
Shine Louise Houston
Cecil Howard
Nicki Hunter
Tom Hyde

I

Kylie Ireland

J

Jenna Jameson
Mike John
Ariana Jollee
Joone
Jules Jordan

K

Kimberly Kane
Jill Kelly
Jennifer Ketcham
Tim Kincaid
Bryan Kocis
Michael Kulich

L

Devinn Lane
Tory Lane
Chi Chi LaRue
Dyanna Lauren
Dan Leal
Bud Lee
Hyapatia Lee
Lorelei Lee
Keiran Lee 
Sunny Leone
John Leslie
Harold Lime
Fred J. Lincoln
Lisa Ann
Miles Long
Michael Lucas
Venus Lux
Rakel Liekki

M

Anna Malle
Mason
Scott Masters
Eon McKai
Sean Michaels
Mitchell brothers
Sharon Mitchell
Britt Morgan
Paul Morris
Michael Morrison
Pat Myne
Tiffany Mynx
Lee Roy Myers

N

Nica Noelle
Paul Norman
Peter North

O

Bill Osco

P

Henri Pachard
Gail Palmer
Al Parker
Wakefield Poole
Ed Powers

R

Michael Raven
Jack Remy
Alex de Renzy
Patti Rhodes
Robby D.
Toby Ross
Bonnie Rotten
Rob Rotten
Will Ryder

S

Herschel Savage
Stephen Sayadian
Steven Scarborough
Margie Schnibbe
Bruce Seven
Shane (actress)
Alexandra Silk
Joey Silvera
J. D. Slater
Justin Slayer
Aurora Snow
P. J. Sparxx
Anthony Spinelli
Steven St. Croix
Jacky St. James
John Stagliano
Ray Dennis Steckler
Jim Steel (director)
Michael Stefano
Carter Stevens
Kirdy Stevens
Jeff Stryker

T

Jerome Tanner
Alexis Texas
Paul Thomas
Viv Thomas
Tiger Tyson

V

Dana Vespoli
Chuck Vincent
Tim Von Swine

W

Jane Waters
Tori Welles
Doris Wishman

Y

Prince Yahshua

Z

Ona Zee
Howard Ziehm

See also

List of female film and television directors
List of film and television directors
List of pornographic performers by decade
List of pornography companies

Lists of film directors
 
Film directors